Terzano is an Italian surname. Notable people with the surname include:

Humberto Terzano (1911–?), Argentine equestrian
Massimo Terzano (1892–1947), Italian cinematographer
Ubaldo Terzano, Italian cinematographer and camera operator

Italian-language surnames